Here to Stay was a Canadian dramatic television anthology miniseries which aired on CBC Television from 1976 to 1977.

Premise
Six different dramatic productions were featured, all relating to the experience of those immigrating to Canada.

Scheduling
Hour-long episodes were broadcast Sundays at 9:00 p.m. (Eastern) from 28 November 1976 to 9 January 1977. The final film in this series was effectively the 1977 season debut of CBC's For The Record series.

Episodes
 The Day My Grandad Died (David Peddie producer; Rene Bonniere director; Michael John Nimchuk writer)
 Honour Thy Father (David Peddie producer; Tony Ferris director; Nika Rylski writer)
 Kaleshnikoff (Philip Keatley producer)
 Maria (Stephen Patrick producer; Allan King director; Rick Salutin writer)
 Turncoat (Beverly Roberts producer; Alan Cooke director; Jonah Royston writer)
 Yesterday Was Years Ago (Eoin Sprott producer; René Bonnière director; Anna Reiser writer)

References

External links
 

CBC Television original programming
1976 Canadian television series debuts
1977 Canadian television series endings